Welcome to Pleasantville is the second studio album by Singer/Songwriter Wally Pleasant, which he released in 1993 on Miranda Records.

Track listing
"She's Addicted to Clothes"
"Merry Christmas Time Again"
"I Hate Cops"
"I've Got a Garden"
"Rock-n-Roll Yard Sale"
"How I Got Lost On the Road Less Traveled But Then Got Instant Karma on I-96"
"Only Everything"
"I Was A Teenage Republican"
"Farmhand A-Go-Go"
"Rock Song"
"Man with a Tan"
"It's a Beautiful Day"
"Smoking"
"I Was a Teenage Republican" (George Bush Megamix Version)

1993 albums
Wally Pleasant albums